Book of Vermilion Fish is the first monograph on goldfish in the world, written by Chinese writer Zhang Qiande (1577－1643) in 1596 during the Ming dynasty.

See also
 Fishkeeping

References 
  A. C. Moule: A Version of the Book of Vermilion Fish. In T'oung Pao. Second Series, Vol. 39, Livr. 1/3 (1950), pp. 1–82.

1590s books
Science books
Ming dynasty literature
Fishkeeping
Goldfish